Jon Istad (29 July 1937 – 17 May 2012) was a Norwegian biathlete and sport shooter.

He was born in Voss and represented the club Voss IL. He was the father of Sverre Istad and uncle of Gro Marit Istad, both Olympians.

He competed at the 1960, 1964 and 1968 Winter Olympics, and all three times finished eleventh in the 20 kilometres. In 1968 he also won a silver medal with the Norwegian relay team. At the World Championships he won a gold medal in the 20 km event in 1966 in Garmisch-Partenkirchen, becoming the second biathlon world champion in Norway's history. In addition, he won two gold medals in relay in 1966 and 1967 and a silver medal in 1969. He was Norwegian champion in the 20 kilometres five times, and once in the relay.

Istad was also a national champion, European Championships bronze medalist and World Championships silver medalist (in the team competition) in sport shooting. He died in May 2012.

Biathlon results
All results are sourced from the International Biathlon Union.

Olympic Games
1 medal (1 silver)

*The relay was added as an event in 1968.

World Championships
7 medals (3 gold, 1 silver, 3 bronze)

*During Olympic seasons competitions are only held for those events not included in the Olympic program.
**The team (time) event was removed in 1965, whilst the relay was added in 1966.

References

External links
 

1937 births
2012 deaths
People from Voss
Norwegian male biathletes
Norwegian male sport shooters
Biathletes at the 1960 Winter Olympics
Biathletes at the 1964 Winter Olympics
Biathletes at the 1968 Winter Olympics
Olympic biathletes of Norway
Medalists at the 1968 Winter Olympics
Olympic medalists in biathlon
Olympic silver medalists for Norway
Biathlon World Championships medalists
Sportspeople from Vestland